The Capture of Ninh Bình took place on 5 December 1873, during Francis Garnier's expedition in Tonkin. A small party of six seamen and one civilian interpreter led by Aspirant Marc Hautefeuille captured the fortified city of Ninh Bình, at the time defended by 1,700 troops.

Background
On 20 November 1873, the city of Hanoi was captured by Lieutenant Francis Garnier, who had been sent there with a small force to solve dispute pitting a French trader and his mercenaries against local authorities. Following the capture of the city, Lieutenant Garnier declared the Red River open to French trade and sent Ensign Adrien Balny d'Avricourt with the Espingole, one of the expedition's two gunboats, in order to enforce the submission of the fortified cities of Hưng Yên and Phủ Lý.
 
Hưng Yên submitted without resistance on 24 November, and Phủ Lý fell to the French on 26 November after a very brief confrontation. Following these successes, Balny d'Avricourt and the Espingole left Phủ Lý on 2 December to go and subdue the city of Hải Dương.
 
Back in Hanoi, Garnier had been informed that the Án sát of Hanoi, the only mandarin who had managed to evade French capture, had sought refuge in Ninh Bình, from where he was organizing alongside the local Governor Nguyễn Vũ to resist the French takeover of the region. Thinking that the Espingole was still in Phủ Lý, Garnier sent 21 years old Aspirant Hautefeuille in a steam launch to the city to carry an order to attack Ninh Bình to Balny d'Avricourt.

Capture of the city
On the morning of 2 December, Hautefeuille left Hanoi, alongside seven sailors, a Vietnamese interpreter from Saigon and two locals from Hanoi that Garnier was sending to Phủ Lý to help with the newly installed administration. The steam launch contained a 4-pounder cannon with 6 shells, and 250 rifle cartridges.
 
As the steam launch reached Phủ Lý on the evening, Hautefeuille was informed by Lê Van Ba, a pro-French local installed there as replacement for the previous prefect, that Balny and the Espingole had departed for Hải Dương earlier that day. Lê Van Ba also notified him of a large dam that was being built nearby, and thus near 3 am, Hautefeuille, his seven sailors and his interpreter set out for the location of the dam's construction.
 
They arrived to the site on the morning. As soon as the French landed, all of the workers ran away. Hautefeuille managed to capture an unimportant mandarin of Ninh Bình who was overseeing the work, but he released him soon afterward. The French sank the two hundreds small boats full of bricks that had been gathered on the river and left the place near 9:00 am. However, the steam launch had a breakdown and had to be hauled from the shore to the Catholic mission of Kẻ Sở, where they arrived at about 4:00 pm.
 
On 4 December, Hautefeuille was informed by the missionaries of a rumor stating that several hundreds soldiers from Ninh Bình had gathered nearby. While two of his sailors were fixing the steam launch, he went on reconnaissance alongside five sailors, his interpreter and a bunch of local volunteers from Phủ Lý. Having encountered no one after a three-hour walk in the stated direction, they returned to Kẻ Sở.
 
In Kẻ Sở, Hautefeuille was informed that another dam was being erected down the river, right next to the city of Ninh Bình. He promptly decided to destroy this one as well, and at 11:00 pm, he set out for Ninh Bình on the steam launch alongside his seven sailors, his interpreter and a local civilian who was to guide them to the city.

 
On 5 December near 4:00 am, the steam launch arrived in sight of Ninh Bình. Alerted by the sound of the ship despite the pitch-dark night, many soldiers got on the walls and the French could now discern them from the distance on the torch-lit parapet. Some of the defenders yelled toward the French. Hautefeuille responded by firing one of his six shells on a fort located on a towering rock formation near the citadel. In reaction, the Vietnamese extinguished th torches and neither parties took any more action for the rest of the night. Hautefeuille turned off the steam launch's engine and waited for the day to break.
 
When the mist and darkness dissipated in the morning, the French could see several hundreds of soldiers looking at them on the walls. As the steam launch approached, it got stranded on shallow, about 200 meters away from the citadel. The French soon set their small ship back afloat, but shortly afterward, as they were trying to move out of the citadel's cannons firing range, the boiler of the old steam launch broke down, rendering the ship completely unusable and covering the small crew with vapor. 
 
After having ordered his men to fix bayonets and carry the flag, Hautefeuille hastily hopped inside the ship's small dinghy with six of his sailors and his interpreter, leaving his remaining sailor and the guide to guard the steam launch and its cannon. Hautefeuille and his seven men then proceeded toward the shore as the citadel's guns fired a few unsuccessful rounds at them, while Vietnamese soldiers were coming out of the fortress in great number.
 
As the squad landed, they were immediately swarmed with curious and friendly villagers, some of whom even attempted to gift an ox to the young officer. Hautefeuille and his men then marched with firm steps toward the citadel's gate. The small squad was soon surrounded by Vietnamese soldiers, who proceeded to march alongside them while pointing their spears and rifles, without daring to initiate hostilities and probably hoping to catch them alive. As they arrived near the moat, Hautefeuille noticed the province's Governor, Nguyễn Vũ, whom he instantly recognized as such due to the four umbrella bearers around him. 
 
With his pistol in hand, Hautefeuille apologized for having shelled the fort and said it was in response to the yelling. He then asked the Governor what his stance on Garnier's proclamation about open trade on the Red River was. The Governor replied that he fully accepted it and wouldn't oppose the French. As a response, Hautefeuille pulled out an official paper taken from the mandarin he had briefly captured at the dam, two days earlier. The paper was a written order from the Governor, proclaiming the conscription of villagers to build dams on the river. Governor Nguyễn Vũ was quite embarrassed, and Hautefeuille asked him for a written proof of his submission to Garnier's will. The Governor consented, but when Hautefeuille demanded to enter the fortress alongside him to witness the writing, however, Nguyễn Vũ firmly refused to allow him in.

 
In a sudden and brutal move, the impetuous French officer seized the old Governor by the collar, put a watch on the nearby table and, holding his handgun on the Governor's temple, threatened to blow his brain out if all the local mandarins, plus the runaway Án sát of Hanoi, were not gathered in front of him within the next 15 minutes. Some of the Vietnamese soldiers around them had moved toward them at this sight, but immediately pulled back when French sailors took aim.
 
Thirteen minutes later, at 7:44, all the mandarins had been gathered and they entered the citadel alongside Hautefeuille and his men. Instead of bringing to Governor to his palace to write the letter of submission as previously stated, the young officer had him and the other mandarins tied up, and then sent a sailor to hoist the French flag on the citadel's tower. 
 
Following, he placed the Governor at a table with some paper to sign a capitulation under the watch of four of his sailors, while he himself went with the province's Lãnh binh (general), the two remaining sailors and his interpreter to inspect the citadel. The Lãnh binh proceeded to give them a guided tour of the fortress, while the 1,700 Vietnamese soldiers had been gathered in the courtyard, down on their knees, their head bowed down and their weapons on the ground besides them.
 
As he came back to the palace where the mandarins were held captive, Hautefeuille found out that the Án sát of Ninh Bình had managed to flee and that the Governor now refused to take responsibility for the capitulation alone, out of fear about consequences. Hautefeuille declared him a prisoner of war and jailed him in the fort on the high rock. The French only kept the five mandarins in captivity while the soldiers were ordered to leave the place without their weapons, which they readily did.
 
The amount of weaponry captured was quite massive: 46 cannons, a dozen of swivel guns, hundreds of rifles, thousands of spears and a vast quantity of gunpowder. In the vault of the citadel, Hautefeuille also found a very large amount of strings of cash coins, the local currency.

Aftermath
With just eight men, the 21 years old aspirant had captured the city of Ninh Bình, and effectively the entire province. On 9 December, Lieutenant Garnier, who arrived to Ninh Bình on the gunboat Scorpion, was quite surprised to see the French flag flying at the top of the citadel. After having congratulated Hautefeuille, Garnier replaced his seven sailors with ten different ones and loaded his 4-pounder cannon on the Scorpion before departing for Nam Dinh on the next day, leaving the young officer in charge of the province.
 
Hautefeuille appointed new mandarins and enlisted locals to his service. He paid some visits to neighbouring villages, accompanied only by his interpreter, and distributed a large amount of the strings of cash coins he had found in the citadel, which soon rendered him quite popular with locals. On 28 December he repulsed an attack by Vietnamese Imperial forces on Gia Viễn. Hautefeuille and his 10 sailors remained in control of the province until 8 January 1874 when Lieutenant Philastre, who had been sent by France to terminate Garnier's rogue expedition, came to fetch them with a ship to bring them back to Saigon.

References

History of Ninh Bình Province
Conflicts in 1873
December 1873 events